Hồng Dân is a rural district of Bạc Liêu province in the Mekong Delta region of Vietnam. As of 2003 the district had a population of 95,182. The district covers an area of 424 km². The district capital lies at Ngan Dừa.

Administrative divisions
The district is divided administratively into 1 township, Ngan Dừa (capital), and the following communes: Vĩnh Lộc, Vĩnh Lộc A, Lộc Ninh, Ninh Thạnh Lợi, Ninh Thạnh Lợi A, Ninh Hòa, Ninh Quới and Ninh Quới A.

Economy
The proportions of GDP by districts are as follows: Agriculture 73%, industry and construction 13%, trade and services 14%. 

The value of agricultural production increased on average 5-6% annually. Industrial and handicraft industry increased from 14-15%. The total income is VND 250.386 billion (VND 2,763,000 per capita - equivalent to 184 USD).

The district also has 8,000 ha dedicated to shrimp farming, fish 400 ha, pineapple 2,570 ha, sugar cane 1,022 ha, and coconut 1,505 ha. 

Traditional handicrafts also employ more than 10,000 in professions such as knitting, textile making, lace trade and carpentry.

Villages
 

Vĩnh Hồng

References

Districts of Bạc Liêu province